Meduza (stylized as MEDUZA) is an Italian production electronic music group consisting of Luca de Gregorio, Mattia Vitale and Simone Giani. They are best known for their 2019 breakthrough song "Piece of Your Heart", which was a collaboration with British production trio Goodboys. It reached number two on the UK Singles Chart upon release, and was nominated for the Grammy Award for Best Dance Recording.

On November 11, 2020, Meduza performed a live set in Cava dei Balestrieri in San Marino. The performance was streamed on Twitch, in conjunction with Live Nation and the Fuser video game.

Discography

Singles

Remixes
 Friendly Fires – "Heaven Let Me In" (2018)
 Ferreck Dawn – "In My Arms" (2019)
 MK – "Body 2 Body" (2019)
 Ritual and Emily Warren – "Using" (2019)
 R Plus and Dido – "My Boy" (2019)
 Dermot Kennedy – "Power Over Me" (2020)
 Lifelike and Kris Menace – "Discopolis 2.0" (2020)
 John Legend featuring Gary Clark Jr. – "Wild" (2020)
 Faithless – "Innadadance" (feat. Suli Breaks & Jazzie B) (2021)
 Ed Sheeran – "Bad Habits" (2021)
 Supermode - Tell Me Why (2022)

Awards and nominations

Grammy Awards

International Dance Music Awards

Notes

References

Italian musical trios
Italian DJs
Italian electronic music groups
Record production trios
Polydor Records artists
Virgin Records artists
Italian house music groups
Musical groups from Milan